Katok may refer to:

Places 
 Kampong Katok, a village in Brunei
 Katok, Afghanistan, a village in Bamyan Province, Afghanistan

People 
 Anatole Katok (1944–2018), American mathematician
 Katok Tsewang Norbu (1698–1755), Tibetan Lama
 Svetlana Katok (born 1947), Russian mathematician
 Wak Katok, character of the Indonesian novel Harimau! Harimau!

Other uses 
 Gorodskoi Katok, ice rink in Bishkek, Kyrgyzstan
 Katok Mga Msis!, Philippine television talk show
 Katok Monastery, Tibetan Buddhist monastery in Sichuan, China